Marcel Joseph Vogel (April 14, 1917 – February 12, 1991) was a research scientist working at the IBM San Jose Research Center for 27 years. He is sometimes referred to as Dr. Vogel, although this title was based on an honorary degree, not a Ph.D. Later in his career, he became interested in various theories of quartz crystals and other occult and esoteric fields of study. The Vogel Crystal type cut was created by him.

Mainstream scientific work
It is claimed that Vogel started his research into luminescence while he was still in his teens. This research eventually led him to publish his thesis, Luminescence in Liquids and Solids and Their Practical Application, in collaboration with University of Chicago's Dr. Peter Pringsheim in 1943.

Two years after the publication, Vogel incorporated his own company, Vogel Luminescence, in San Francisco. For the next decade the firm developed a variety of new products: fluorescent crayons, tags for insecticides, a black light inspection kit to determine the secret trackways of rodents in cellars from their urine and the psychedelic colors popular in "new age" posters. In 1957, Vogel Luminescence was sold to Ultra Violet Products and Vogel joined IBM as a full-time research scientist. He retired from IBM in 1984.

In 1977 and 1978, Vogel participated in experiments with the Markovich Tesla Electrical Power Source, referred to as MTEPS, that was built by Peter T. Markovich.

He received 32 patents for his inventions up through his tenure at IBM. Among these was the magnetic coating for the 24" hard disk drive systems still in use. His areas of expertise, besides luminescence, were phosphor technology, magnetics and liquid crystal systems.

At Vogel's February 14, 1991 funeral, IBM researcher and Sacramento, California physician Bernard McGinity, M.D. said of him, "He made his mark because of the brilliance of his mind, his prolific ideas, and his seemingly limitless creativity."

Esoteric and occult studies

Billy Meier UFO metal sample
According to the book Light Years by Gary Kinder, Vogel examined a metal sample which was allegedly given to Billy Meier by extraterrestrials and marveled at its unusual properties (Vogel stated it contained the element thulium). An investigator with the Independent Investigations Group said the element detected by Vogel was aluminum and not thulium. Kinder however states in his book that the metal sample had disappeared after Vogel's analysis and was never found again.

Communication between plants
Vogel said he could duplicate the "Backster effect" using plants as transducers for bio-energetic fields from the human mind, showing that they respond to human thought. He said his findings had the same effect irrespective of distance and suggested that "inverse square law does not apply to thought" (See also: Inverse square law). Vogel was a proponent of research into plant consciousness. He spurred fellow researcher Randall Fontes into furthering this work. Vogel was featured in the first episode of In Search Of... hosted by Leonard Nimoy, called "Other Voices". He gave his theories regarding the possibility of communication between plants.

See also
Pyramid power
Crystal healing

References

External links
 Vogel biographical sketch at Vogel Crystals website
 Vogel at the IBM100 Magnetic Stripe Technology team website

1917 births
1991 deaths
20th-century American chemists
Computer storage media
Esotericists
IBM employees
Liquid crystal displays
Luminescence
American materials scientists
People from San Jose, California
20th-century American inventors